Erik Albert Pettersson (18 May 1890 – 4 April 1975) was a Swedish weightlifter. He won a bronze medal in the light-heavyweight division (under 82.5 kg) at the 1920 Summer Olympics.

References

1890 births
1975 deaths
People from Nyköping Municipality
Swedish male weightlifters
Olympic weightlifters of Sweden
Weightlifters at the 1920 Summer Olympics
Olympic bronze medalists for Sweden
Olympic medalists in weightlifting
Medalists at the 1920 Summer Olympics
Sportspeople from Södermanland County